The Women's marathon at the 2014 Commonwealth Games, as part of the athletics programme, was held in Glasgow on 27 July 2014.  The same course is used for both Men's marathon and Women's marathon.

Results

References

Women's marathon
2014
2014 in women's athletics
Glasgow Green
Comm
2014 Commonwealth Games